Family Feud is the fourth studio album by American rap group The Dayton Family, from Flint, Michigan. It was released on July 12, 2005, via Fast Life Records. The album spawned two singles: "Chevys" and "Can't Get Out."

Track listing
Family Feud
Bulldoggin'
Where You From (featuring Capone)
Chevys
What Would You Do
Murder on My Block
Hate Me If You Wanna
What is Your Issue?
I'm a Gangsta
Ass Whoop
We Won't Fall
Reckless (featuring Cormega)
Calico (featuring Kurupt)
Everyday Hoe (featuring MC Breed)
Dayton Niggaz
Formula 51
Get Crunk
Everything's Chicken (But the Bone)
Can't Get Out

Chart history

References

External links 
 Family Feud by The Dayton Family on iTunes

2005 albums
The Dayton Family albums